Henry Edward Askew (31 December 1917 – 31 October 1986) was a British athlete. He competed in the men's long jump at the 1948 Summer Olympics.

References

External links
 

1917 births
1986 deaths
Athletes (track and field) at the 1948 Summer Olympics
English male long jumpers
Olympic athletes of Great Britain
Sportspeople from Barrow-in-Furness